Pride of Midnight (1966-1979) was a Tennessee Walking Horse who had a short career as a show horse but became very notable as a sire in his breed.

Life
Pride of Midnight was foaled in 1966. He was a black stallion with a snip of white on his nose. He was sired by the two-time World Grand Champion Midnight Sun and out of the mare Pride of Stanley. His paternal grandsire was Wilson's Allen, and his great-grandsire was the foundation stallion Roan Allen. He was bred and owned by Harlinsdale Farm.
 
Pride of Midnight was trained by Dot Warren and won first in several horse shows, but was retired to breeding at a young age. He became one of the most notable sires in the Tennessee Walking Horse industry. 
He died in 1979, after colicking twice.
Bill Harlin, one of Harlinsdale's owners, later said that when Pride of Midnight died, it was the last time he saw his father cry.

Influence
During his lifetime Pride of Midnight sired 1703 foals who were registered with the Tennessee Walking Horse Breeders' and Exhibitors' Association. Numerous World and World Grand Champions are among his descendants. His son Pride's Generator was a three-time World Champion and also a notable sire.
His grandsons include Cash for Keeps, the 2000 World Grand Champion; Generator's Silver Dollar, a notable stud; Gen's Armed and Dangerous, the 1993 World Grand Champion; The Skywatch, two-time World Champion; and Generator's Santana, the 1997 World Grand Champion.

References

Individual Tennessee Walking Horses